Niki Francesca (born  on 22 October 1989), known as Nick Gain, is an Andorran electronic rock DJ, singer-songwriter, and producer. He is best known for having represented his country Andorra in the Eurovision Song Contest 2007. He now produces his own music under the name Nick Gain, mixing rock and dance music.

Anonymous

Gain was the lead singer of Anonymous, a punk rock band from Andorra. He moved to Andorra with his British mother and Andorran father as a young child.

Anonymous represented Andorra in the Eurovision Song Contest 2007, placing 12th in the semi-final.

Music
Gain has composed for Anonymous, Trilobeats and himself.

Born in the '80s (styled Born in the 80's) is Gain's first self-produced EP. It contains five songs which received collaboration and help by top producers: Micky Forteza (Jarabe de Palo), Mike Marsh (Depeche Mode, Oasis, Prodigy, Chemical Brothers), Hal Ritson (The Young Punx, Black Eyed Peas, David Guetta) and Sonnos.

In May 2014, Gain released his first videoclip.

References

Living people
Eurovision Song Contest entrants for Andorra
Eurovision Song Contest entrants of 2007
Andorran male singers
Andorran people of British descent
Berklee College of Music alumni
1989 births
21st-century British male singers